The 1978 North American Soccer League playoffs began on August 8 and ended on August 27 with Soccer Bowl '78 at Giants Stadium in East Rutherford, New Jersey. 16 out of 24 teams qualified after a 30-match regular season, eight from each conference.

Playoff format
The top two teams in each division would quality for the playoffs. The other spots would go to the next best two teams in the conference, regardless of division. The top three seeds went to the division winners, seeds 4-6 went to the second place teams and the last two seeds were known as 'wild-cards', a nod to the NFL's playoff format. The winners of each successive round would be reseeded within the conference by point total.  The first round and the Soccer Bowl were single games, while the conference semifinals and championships were two-game series. As in the 1977 playoffs, if both teams were tied at one win apiece at the conclusion of Game 2, there would be a 30-minute sudden-death mini-game and a shootout if necessary.

Playoff seeds

American Conference
Detroit Express – Central Division champions, 176 points
New England Tea Men – Eastern Division champions, 165 points
San Diego Sockers – Western Division champions, 164 points
Tampa Bay Rowdies – 165 points
Chicago Sting – 123 points 
California Surf – 115 points
Fort Lauderdale Strikers – 143 points
Philadelphia Fury – 111 points

National Conference
Cosmos – Eastern Division champions, 212 points
Vancouver Whitecaps – Western Division champions, 199 points
Minnesota Kicks – Central Division champions, 156 points
Portland Timbers – 167 points
Washington Diplomats – 145 points
Tulsa Roughnecks – 132 points
Toronto Metros-Croatia – 144 points
Seattle Sounders – 138 points

Bracket

Conference Quarterfinals

American Conference

(1) Detroit Express vs. (8) Philadelphia Fury

(2) New England Tea Men vs. (7) Fort Lauderdale Strikers

(3) San Diego Sockers vs. (6) California Surf

(4) Tampa Bay Rowdies vs. (5) Chicago Sting

National Conference

(1) Cosmos vs. (8) Seattle Sounders

(2) Vancouver Whitecaps vs. (7) Toronto Metros-Croatia

(3) Minnesota Kicks vs. (6) Tulsa Roughnecks

(4) Portland Timbers vs. (5) Washington Diplomats

Conference semifinals

American Conference

(1) Detroit Express vs. (7) Ft. Lauderdale Strikers

Fort Lauderdale wins series 2–1

(3) San Diego Sockers vs. (4) Tampa Bay Rowdies

Tampa Bay wins series 2–1

National Conference

(1) Cosmos vs. (3) Minnesota Kicks

New York wins series 2–1

(2) Vancouver Whitecaps vs. (4) Portland Timbers

Portland wins series 2–0

Conference finals

American Conference

(4) Tampa Bay Rowdies vs. (7) Ft. Lauderdale Strikers

Tampa Bay wins series 2–1

National Conference

(1) Cosmos vs. (4) Portland Timbers

New York wins series 2–0

Soccer Bowl '78

1978 NASL Champions: Cosmos

Playoff Statistics

Mini-games are not counted as games played when compiling individual statistics. They are included in the minutes played category.

Scoring
GP = Games Played, G = Goals (worth 2 points), A = Assists (worth 1 point), Pts = Points

Goalkeeping

Note: GP = Games played; Min – Minutes played; GA = Goals against; GAA = Goals against average; W = Wins; L = Losses; SO = Shutouts

References

External links
 The Year in American Soccer – 1978
 Chris Page's NASL Archive
 Complete NASL Results and Standings

North American Soccer League (1968–1984) seasons
1978 in American soccer